Capri (later Mercury Capri) is a nameplate marketed by the Lincoln-Mercury division of Ford Motor Company on three distinct series of automobiles between 1970 and 1994.  

From 1970 to 1978, the Capri was a sport compact marketed in North America by the Lincoln-Mercury division without any Ford or Mercury divisional branding; it was a captive import, built by Ford of Europe sold simply as the Capri.  From 1979 to 1986, the Capri became part of the Mercury model line as a pony car.  From 1991 to 1994, the Mercury Capri was a roadster was a captive import, built by Ford Australia (and sold outside North America as the Ford Capri). 

In North America, the Capri was marketed without a direct Ford-brand counterpart for its first and third generations, although it was sold in other markets under the Ford brand.

Origin of name
The Capri nameplate is derived from the namesake Italian island; in automotive use, it has been used by all three Ford divisions.  In 1952, the Lincoln Capri marked the first use of the nameplate, serving as a trim level through 1959.  From 1962 to 1964, Ford of Britain introduced a Ford Consul Capri two-door hardtop coupe.  For 1966 and 1967, the Capri name was first used by Mercury, denoting the standard trim of the Mercury Comet.

For 1968, Ford of Europe developed the Ford Capri two-door coupé as its counterpart to the Mustang.  In line with the Mustang, the Capri was styled with a long hood and a short deck (trunk lid; later hatchback) with a fastback-style roofline.

First generation (1970–1978)

Capri (1970–1975) 
The first generation of the Capri was a captive import produced by Ford of Europe in Cologne, Germany.  Introduced in Europe for 1968 (and designed by Ford of Britain using locally sourced components from the Cortina MkII and Escort with plans dating back to 1964 when the development of a European variant of the Mustang commenced), the Ford Capri was marketed by the Lincoln-Mercury Division starting in April 1970.  While marketed as part of the Mercury model line, the Capri did not carry any divisional identification.  Priced at $2,300  at the time of its launch, ($ in  dollars ) the Capri was marketed as an economical sporty coupe (with no upscale trim levels, unlike its European-market variants e.g. the GT, RS, L, XL, and XLR which were trim levels), far smaller than the Mercury Cougar and Montego.

In its adaptation to the American market, the Capri saw several minor revisions, with the two rectangular headlights of the Ford Capri replaced by four circular headlamps (shared with some upscale Capri models sold for the European market e.g. the RS or GT - the rectangular lighting did not meet FMVSS 108), grille-mounted turn signals, and side marker lights; Rostyle wheels were fitted as standard equipment.  While produced in Germany as a variant of the Ford Cortina, the Capri adopted powertrain commonality with the newly introduced Ford Pinto.  Originally powered by a 1.6L Kent "crossflow" inline-four, the Capri received a 2.0L "OHC" inline-4 for 1971.  As an option, for 1972, Mercury introduced a 2.6L Cologne V6, becoming the first American-market vehicle marketed by Ford Motor Company with a V6 engine.  For 1974, the V6 was enlarged to 2.8L, as Ford revised castings for both the engine block and cylinder heads.

For 1973, the front bumper underwent a revision to comply with 5-mph bumper standards.  The previous chrome bumper was reinforced with a steel tube and attached to the frame with shock absorbers (extending the length of the body several inches).  As part of the change, the Capri saw revisions to the grille, taillamps, and its rear quarter trim grilles.  As part of an interior revision, the Capri was given a new steering wheel, dashboard, and seat trim along with a redesigned wiring harness.  For 1974, 5 mph bumpers were fitted to both front and rear, replacing the previous chrome tube bumpers with reinforced body-colored plastic bumpers.

A Mercury version of the Ford Mustang II badged as a Capri (as evidenced by a proposal using the Mustang II's 2+2 body with a rounded rear quarter window style and characteristic bodyside sculpting) was briefly considered, but the strong sales of the Ford Capri (Mk1) as a captive import shelved those plans.

Capri II (1976–1978)

After the 1974 redesign of the Ford Capri, Lincoln-Mercury commenced American sales of the Capri Mk II in 1975 as an early 1976 model.  Skipping the 1975 model year entirely, Lincoln-Mercury renamed the Capri to the Capri II, again omitting any formal divisional identification from the vehicle.  While sharing similar styling to its predecessor, the Capri II adopted a hatchback roofline.  As with the 1970–1974 Capri, to adapt to the American market, the Capri II was fitted with quad sealed-beam headlamps, grille-mounted turn signals, 5-mph bumpers, and body-color side-view mirror(s).

Again maintaining powertrain commonality with the Ford Pinto, Ford Mustang II and Mercury Bobcat, the Capri II was fitted with the 2.3L OHC engine, offering a 2.8L V6 as an option.

After the 1977 model year, Lincoln-Mercury ended imports of the Capri II from Ford of Europe, with unsold examples sold during the 1978 model year.  In total, 513,500 Capri/Capri IIs were sold from 1970 to 1978 by Lincoln-Mercury. At its peak, yearly Capri sales in North America were the highest for any import vehicle (except for the Volkswagen Beetle).  Ford of Europe continued production of the Capri for another generation, through the end of 1986.

Reception

Road & Track magazine on the 1970 Capri 1600: "...But styling and image sells cars, right? And if that's true, then it's our opinion that Lincoln-Mercury has a real winner in the Capri."

R&T on the Capri 2000 in February 1971: "The Capri has a lot to recommend it. It's a solidly built, sporty compact car and (especially with the 2-liter engine) fun to drive."

R&T on the Capri 2600 V6 in March 1972: "...the Capri 2600 V6 is an outstanding car. We'll bet Lincoln-Mercury dealers won't be able to get enough of them to satisfy the demand."

R&T on the Capri 2800 V6: "...the V6 Capri remains a very attractive sporting car. It's solid as a Mercedes, still compact and light in the context of 1974 barrier busters, fast, reasonably economical of fuel, precise-handling, and quick-stopping: its engine and drivetrain are both sporty and refined. It's no wonder Lincoln-Mercury sold nearly 120,000 of them in 1973..."

R&T on the Capri II 2.8 V6: "Once again we can report that the Capri V6 is an attractive, competent, and enjoyable car at a reasonable price. It goes, stops, and handles, it's well built and it has that sturdy, precise European character that makes it something special for Americans and Canadians. On top of all this, it's a more practical car because of its new hatchback body. A quality, European car at a realistic price-what more could one want."

The car features prominently in the 1982 movie "The First Time," with Jennifer Jason-Leigh, where her grandmother gives her hers after she buys a new Corvette, and teaches her to drive a stick.

Special editions
1976–1977 JPS Capri II, Capri II S - Black or white car body with gold striping, "black chrome" trim, gold and black styled steel wheels and gold badging and grille surround.

In Europe, the JPS Capri II celebrated the success of the John Player Special-sponsored Team Lotus Formula 1 team and emulated its black and gold livery. In the US, anti-tobacco advertising laws required a name change to Capri II S. The interior received special seats and door panels: black with gold cloth inserts.

Second generation (1979–1986)

For the 1979 model year, a second generation of the Capri was introduced.  As part of several changes over its predecessor, the Capri was officially part of the Mercury model line as Lincoln-Mercury ended captive imports of the Ford Capri in favor of creating a Mercury counterpart of the 1979 Ford Mustang.  Sharing the Fox platform with the Mustang, the 1979 Mercury Capri marked the first Mercury "pony car" since the 1970 Mercury Cougar.    

While visually similar to the Mustang, the second-generation Capri was offered solely in the three-door hatchback configuration.  The Capri was styled with its own front fascia, a vertically-mounted grille, and dark-tinted taillamps with horizontally-ribbed lenses.  In place of the widely flared wheel openings of the Mustang, the Capri was styled with slightly flared wheel openings and widened front and rear fenders.  For 1983, the Capri received a redesign of the rear hatchback, distinguished with a large compound-curve "bubble-back" rear window.   For 1984, the front fascia of the Capri RS was fitted with a front air dam, with the same exterior continuing through 1986.

Along with the base-trim Capri, Mercury offered the Capri Ghia (shared with the Mustang), Capri GS, Capri RS, and Capri Turbo RS.  The Capri RS/Turbo RS was the Capri equivalent of a Mustang GT.  During its production, the second-generation Capri maintained powertrain commonality with the Ford Mustang, with inline-four, inline-6, V6, and V8 engines offered during its production; the only Mustang model with no Capri equivalent was the Mustang SVO.

The second-generation Capri was produced through the 1986 model year.  For 1987, while the Mustang underwent a mid-cycle update (lasting to 1993), Mercury withdrew the Capri, focusing on the Cougar XR7 as its two-door performance vehicle; the next Mercury hatchback sports coupe was the 1999 Cougar.

Special editions
1981–1983 Black Magic - Black cars with gold striping, gold metric TRX wheels and a gold cat's head on each side of the front valance.  The interior received special black seats with sand-colored inserts (code YA), with Recaro seating optional in 1982 (code TA) and Sport Performance seating optional in 1983 (code HA). In the 1981 and 1982 models years the Black Magic option could be ordered with polar white (code 9D) paint but otherwise had the same exterior appointments as the black cars (gold striping, gold TRX wheels, and gold cat's heads). Magazine ads for the 9D Black Magic used the term "white lightning" but the name of the package was still Black Magic. The 1983 model is extremely rare and the only Black Magic to receive the compound rear window.

1983 Crimson Cat - Bright red (code 27) paint with gold striping and Cougar XR-7 TRX wheels set this car apart. Crimson Cat received black sport performance seating with red inserts (code KA).

1984 Charcoal Turbo RS - A Capri RS Turbo that was only available in charcoal upper-silver lower exterior paint with light grey striped rub moldings, Garrett 60 trim turbocharger, enhanced multiport EFI four-cylinder engine, Michelin TRX package, 5.0 HO Sway bars, 3.45:1 limited-slip rear axle, hood scoop, and orange and red lettering and striping. Sun- and T-top roofs were optional.

1985 Mercury Motorsport Capri   - Built as pace car replicas to commemorate the 1985 Detroit Grand Prix & Motorcity 100. These were also cosmetically modified by American Sunroof Company for Mercury and are highly sought after for their low production of less than 50 cars and availability in only Michigan & Ohio.

Gallery

Motorsport
This particular generation was successful in the Trans Am Series, winning the championship from 1984 to 1985 with an aftermarket V8 engine. The Mercury Capri 5.0L was the car used by the Jack Roush team with Wally Dallenbach Jr. driving to win the 1985 Sports Car Club of America (SCCA) Trans AM championship.

Variants

ASC McLaren (1984–1986) 

ASC (American Sunroof Corporation, now known as American Specialty Cars) produced several conversions of Mercury Capris from 1984 to 1986.  Along with convertible conversions, hatchbacks were restyled (renamed as coupes by the company).

The coupes were tuned and enhanced with several suspension and visual upgrades including striping, a built-in radar detector, ground effects, Hella fog lights, headlight and taillight covers and Italian Campagnolo honeycomb-style wheels.

For 1984, coupes (10 produced) were all painted midnight blue. The 1985-1986 coupes (150 produced in 1985) were either painted blue or white. In 1986 (115 made), the last year for the coupes, customers had an even larger choice of colors, including smoke charcoal grey and raven black, joining the Oxford white and midnight blue, as well as silver metallic. http://www.ascmclaren.com/capripics.htm

In comparison to the coupes, convertibles were a far more involved project, as the conversion required the redesign of the unibody chassis.  As part of the conversion, the convertible top replaced the rear seats.  The manual top design is specific to the vehicle, requiring design-specific equipment (such as seals, weatherstripping, and windshield moldings).  Fabrication required a replacement rear deck lid, floor reinforcements, quarter panel caps, tonneau cover and a windshield that was raked back an extra 10 degrees

In total, 557 convertibles were built during its 1984-1986 production run.

Powertrain upgrades 
ASC McLaren coupes were equipped with the Ford Motorsport B303 camshaft, creating significantly more power than the rated / of the standard 5.0L motors. Additionally, all coupes were shod with BFGoodrich Comp T/A radials. The 225/50/15 low profile size of these tires (as opposed to the standard 5.0L Capri's 225/60/15) raised the ASC/McLaren Coupe's effective gear ratio from 3.08:1 to approximately 3.35:1.

These were the quickest cars produced by Ford in 1985 and 1986 with zero to sixty times well under six seconds and quarter-mile times in the mid-13 second range.

Ford Mustang (Mexico, 1981–1984)

The third-generation Ford Mustang was manufactured in the Ford Cuautitlán Izcalli plant (located in Mexico City) from 1979 to 1984.  Produced for sale in Mexico, the vehicles were produced in both hatchback and notchback coupe body configurations.

From 1981 to 1984, Cuautitlán Assembly produced the Mustang using components from both the Mustang and Mercury Capri.  Along with the taillights of the Capri, the Mustangs were produced using the front fascia of the Capri (with Ford badging) from 1982 to 1983.  From 1983 to 1984, the facility produced the Mustang hatchback with front and rear fenders of the Capri, along with its "bubble-back" rear hatch.

Third generation (1991–1994)

For the 1991 model year, the Mercury Capri made its return to the Mercury division after a five-year hiatus.  To give Lincoln-Mercury a competitor for the Mazda MX-5 Miata and Toyota MR2, the Capri was released as a two-door roadster. In a fashion similar to the first-generation Mercury Capri, the third-generation version is a captive import; produced by Ford of Australia alongside its Ford Capri counterpart and the Ford Falcon, the Mercury Capri was intended for American exports. For the first time since 1978, the Mercury Capri was the first Mercury without any Ford counterpart in North America.

Derived from the Australian Ford Laser (sold in the United States as the first-generation Mercury Tracer), the Ford Capri also shares drivetrain commonality with the Mazda 323. To adapt the Capri for North American sale, Lincoln-Mercury made several changes over the Australian-market Capri. Along with the addition of a driver-side airbag (required to meet passive restraint requirements), the dashboard was changed to non-metric gauges; Mercury Capris are fitted with body-color bumpers.

While both two-door convertibles similar in size and price, the Mercury Capri and Mazda MX-5 featured major departures in powertrain and interior configurations, with the Capri adopting a front-wheel-drive powertrain. While the MX-5 was strictly a two-seat vehicle, the Capri was a 2+2, with (small) rear seats.  Along with folding back seats (allowing access to the trunk), the Capri also offered the option of a removable hardtop (similar to the MX-5).

From 1991 to 1993, the Mercury Capri was sold with minimal revisions; for 1994, the Mercury Capri received the new taillamps and front and rear bumpers received by the Ford Capri in 1993.  During its entire production, the Mercury Capri was sold under two trim levels: base-trim and XR2, distinguished largely by the powertrain. The base trim was equipped with a 100 hp Mazda 1.6L DOHC inline-4; the XR2 was equipped with a turbocharged version of the 1.6L engine, rated at 132 hp. A five-speed manual transmission was standard for both trims, with a four-speed automatic available on base-trim Capris. The XR2 came standard with a new suspension tune, better tires, and a revised appearance.

See also

References

http://consumerguide.com/used/1990-94-mercury-capri/

External links

 Motor Sport Capri
 Team Capri

Capri
Rear-wheel-drive vehicles
Roadsters
Convertibles
Coupés
Hatchbacks
1970s cars
1980s cars
1990s cars
Cars introduced in 1969
Pony cars
Front-wheel-drive sports cars